Pludry  is a village in the administrative district of Gmina Dobrodzień, within Olesno County, Opole Voivodeship, in south-western Poland.

The village was part of Germany until 1945. Like other communities in Gmina Dobrodzień/Guttentag, it is officially bilingual in both Polish and German.

References

Pludry